Boxley Warren is a   Local Nature Reserve north of Maidstone in Kent. It is privately owned and managed by Maidstone Borough Council. It is part of North Downs Woodlands  Special Area of Conservation and Wouldham to Detling Escarpment  Site of Special Scientific Interest

This site is yew woodland with diverse fauna and flora. It includes the White Horse Stone, a Neolithic standing stone which is a Scheduled Monument.

There is access from the North Downs Way.

References

Local Nature Reserves in Kent